The 2012–13 Armenian Cup was the 22nd season of Armenia's football knockout competition. It featured the eight 2012–13 Premier League teams and Alashkert Martuni from the 2012–13 First Division.  The tournament began on 14 November 2012, with Shirak the defending champions, having won their first title the previous season. Pyunik beat defending champions Shirak 1-0 in the final, winning them their 5th Armenian Independence Cup. As winners, Pyunik qualify for the first qualifying round of the 2013–14 UEFA Europa League.

Results

First round
Alashkert from the First Division played in the first round against Banants from the Premier League. The rest of the teams received a bye to the quarter finals. The first leg was played on 14 November, with the second leg took place on 28 November 2012.

|}

Quarter-finals
The remaining seven Premier League clubs entered the competition in this round, together with the winner from the first round. The first legs were played on 1 March 2013, while the second legs were played on 12 March 2013.

|}

Semi-finals
The four winners from the quarterfinals entered this round. The first legs were played on 2 and 3 April 2013, with the second legs completed on 16 and 17 April 2013.

|}

Final

References

External links

 Armenia Cup 2013 at Soccerway.com

Armenian Cup seasons
Armenian Cup
Cup